Pavlína Ščasná (born 3 April 1982) is a Czech former football striker who last played for Swedish champion LdB Malmö.

Career
She played four years in Sparta Prague before earning Bayern Munich attention. In her first season at Bayern she was the team's top scorer with 14 goals. At the age of 20 she moved to WUSA's Philadelphia Charge, becoming the first Czech player of women's football in the United States. The WUSA folded in September 2003, so Ščasná returned to Bayern. She played a few more seasons in the Bundesliga before moving to Damallsvenskan in 2006. She spent two years in KIF Örebro DFF and then signed for LdB Malmö, with which she won the 2010 league, her first national title since she left the Czech league. She was drafted by Atlanta Beat in the 2010 WPS Dispersal Draft, but she decided to remain in Malmö. After knee injury in March 2011 she ended with football.

She was an international player for a decade, scoring 24 goals in 50 games for the Czech national team. She retired from international football in Autumn 2008. She was named Czech Footballer of the Year (women) five times, in 1998, 2004, 2006, 2007 and 2008.

Personal life
Ščasná is the daughter of manager and former international player Zdeněk Ščasný. She began playing football in the junior teams of her father's last two teams as a player, Anagennisi Dherynia in Cyprus and SK Roudnice nad Labem. Her brother Michal is also a professional footballer. In August 2011, Ščasná married footballer Rostislav Novák at the Vrtba Garden in Prague.

Honours

Club
 Sparta Prague
I. liga žen: 1997–98, 1998–99, 1999–00, 2000–01

 LdB Malmö / FC Rosengård
Damallsvenskan: 2010

Individual
Czech Women Footballer of the Year: 1998, 2004, 2006, 2007, 2008

References

External links
 
 
 Player national team profile  at FAČR
 Player German domestic football stats  at DFB
 
 
 

1982 births
Living people
Czech women's footballers
Czech Republic women's international footballers
People from Roudnice nad Labem
Czech expatriate women's footballers
Expatriate women's footballers in Germany
Expatriate women's footballers in Sweden
Czech expatriate sportspeople in Germany
Czech expatriate sportspeople in Sweden
Expatriate women's soccer players in the United States
Czech expatriate sportspeople in the United States
Women's United Soccer Association players
Philadelphia Charge players
KIF Örebro DFF players
Damallsvenskan players
FC Rosengård players
FC Bayern Munich (women) players
Women's association football forwards
Frauen-Bundesliga players
AC Sparta Praha (women) players
Czech Women's First League players
Sportspeople from the Ústí nad Labem Region